In medicine, the mean arterial pressure (MAP) is an average blood pressure in an individual during a single cardiac cycle. MAP is altered by cardiac output and systemic vascular resistance.

Testing 

Mean arterial pressure can be measured directly or estimate from systolic and diastolic blood pressure by using a formula. The least invasive method is the use of an blood pressure cuff which gives the values to calculate an estimate of the mean pressure. A similar method is to use a oscillometric blood pressure device that works by a cuff only method where a microprocessor determines the systolic and diastolic blood pressure. Invasively, an arterial catheter with a transducer is placed and the mean pressure is determined by the subsequent waveform.

Estimating MAP
While MAP can only be measured directly by invasive monitoring it can be estimated by using a formula in which the lower (diastolic) blood pressure is doubled and added to the higher (systolic) blood pressure and that composite sum then is divided by 3 to estimate MAP.

Thus, a common way to estimate mean arterial pressure is: 

 

where: 

 DP = diastolic pressure
 SP = systolic pressure
 MAP = mean arterial pressure

Systolic pressure minus diastolic pressure equals the pulse pressure which may be substituted in.

Another way to find the MAP is to use the Systemic Vascular Resistance equated, which is represented mathematically by the formula 
 

In other words:

Therefore, Mean arterial pressure can be determined by rearranging the equation to:

where:
 is cardiac output
 is systemic vascular resistance
 is central venous pressure and usually is small enough to be neglected in this formula.
This is only valid at normal resting heart rates during which  can be approximated using the measured systolic and diastolic blood pressures:

Elevated heart rate 
At high heart rates  is more closely approximated by the arithmetic mean of systolic and diastolic pressures because of the change in shape of the arterial pressure pulse.

 

Where 

 HR = heart rate.
 DP = diastolic pressure
 MAP = mean arterial pressure
 PP = pulse pressure which is systolic minus diastolic pressure

Most accurate 
The version of the MAP equation multiplying 0.412 by pulse pressure and adding diastolic blood is indicated to correlate better than other versions of the equation with left ventricular hypertrophy, carotid wall thickness and aortic stiffness. It is expressed:

where:

 DBP = diastolic pressure
 MAP = mean arterial pressure
 PP = pulse pressure

Young Patients 
For young patients with congenital heart disease a slight alteration to the factor used found to be more precise. This was written as:

where:

DBP = diastolic pressure
 MAP = mean arterial pressure
 PP = pulse pressure

This added precision means cerebral blood flow can be more accurately maintained in uncontrolled hypertension.

Neonates 
For neonates, because of their altered physiology, a different formula has been proposed for a more precise reading:

where:

DBP = diastolic pressure
 MAP = mean arterial pressure
 PP = pulse pressure

It has also been suggested that when getting readings from a neonates radial arterial line, mean arterial pressure can be approximated by averaging the systolic and diastolic pressure.

Other formula versions 
Other formulas used to estimate mean arterial pressure are:

or

or

or

 MAP = mean arterial pressure
 PP = pulse pressure
 DAP = diastolic aortic pressure
 DPB = diastolic blood pressure

Clinical significance

Mean arterial pressure is a major determinant of the perfusion pressure seen by organs in the body. It is believed that a MAP that is greater than 70 mmHg is enough to sustain the organs of the average person. MAP is normally between 65 and 110 mmHg.

Hypotension 
When assessing hypotension, the context of the patient’s baseline blood pressure needs to be considered. Acute decreases in mean arterial pressure of around 25% put patients at increased risk for end-organ damage and potential morbidity and mortality. Even 1 minute at a mean arterial pressure of 50 mmHg, or accumulative effects over short periods, increases the risk of mortality by 5% and can result in organ failure or complications.

MAP may be used like systolic blood pressure in monitoring and treating target blood pressure. Both have been shown advantageous targets for sepsis, major trauma, stroke, intracranial bleed. In patients with sepsis, the vasopressor dosage may be titrated on the basis of estimated MAP.

Hypertension 
In younger patients, elevated mean arterial pressure has been shown to be more important than pulse pressure in the prediction of stroke. However in older patients, MAP has been found to be less predictive of stroke and a better predictor of cardiovascular disease.

See also 
 Blood pressure
 Hypertension
 Hypotension
 Systemic vascular resistance
 Pulse pressure

References

External links 
 Mean Arterial Pressure Calculator
 More Information on usage of the Mean Arterial Pressure

Diagnostic intensive care medicine
Medical signs
Blood pressure

it:Pressione arteriosa differenziale